Cobham Park near Cobham, Kent and located within the grounds of the Cobham Hall estate, was used a cricket ground. It was used as the venue for a single first-class cricket match between a team representing Kent and a Hampshire side.

The ground was used for cricket matches by Cobham Cricket Club between the 1850s and 1870s, including a number of matches against the Royal Engineers Cricket Club. The Hall was owned by the Earls of Darnley and a number of the family were keen cricketers. Ivo Bligh, who became the 8th Earl in 1900, captained the first English tour of Australia in 1882–83, recapturing The Ashes.

The hall was last used for cricket in 1951.

References

1792 establishments in England
Cricket grounds in Kent
Defunct cricket grounds in England
Defunct sports venues in Kent
English cricket venues in the 18th century
History of Kent
Sports venues completed in 1792
1879 disestablishments in England